Carotenoid-9',10'-cleaving dioxygenase (BCO2 (gene), beta-carotene 9',10'-monooxygenase (misleading)) is an enzyme with systematic name all-trans-beta-carotene:O2 oxidoreductase (9',10'-cleaving). This enzyme catalyses the following chemical reaction

 all-trans-beta-carotene + O2  all-trans-10'-apo-beta-carotenal + beta-ionone

Carotenoid-9',10'-cleaving dioxygenase contains Fe2+.

References

External links 
 

EC 1.13.11